Ricardo Perez Ibarra (born 4 April 1988) is a Spanish professional soft-tip and steel-tip darts player who currently plays in the World Darts Federation (WDF) and Professional Darts Corporation (PDC) events. He is an EDU European Darts Champion and EDF European Darts Championship silver medalist.

Career
Perez played his first tournaments on electronic dartboards. In 2018, thanks to good results in domestic steel-tip tournaments, he was invited to participate in the 2018 Winmau World Masters. He advanced to the third round where he lost to Aaron Turner by 1–3 in sets. A month later, at the Italian Open, he advanced to the final, where he lost to Martin Adams by 5–6 in legs. It was his first final on steel-tip tournament.

He returned to international competitions in 2022, when he won the gold medal in cricket competition at the EDU European Darts Championship. In the final of the tournament he defeated Dragutin Pecnjak. He won another medal individually during EDF European Darts Championship, but in the final he lost to Boris Krčmar. In December 2022, he took part in the 2022 Winmau World Masters, where he advanced to the final phase of the tournament. In the fourth round he lost to Vítězslav Sedlák by 1–5 in legs.

In January 2023, he took part in the PDC Q-School qualifying tournament.

Performance timeline

References

1988 births
Living people
Spanish darts players